Rus is a commune located in Sălaj County, Transylvania, Romania. It is composed of three villages: Buzaș (Buzamező), Fântânele-Rus (Kabalapatak) and Rus. It also included two other villages until 2002, when they were split off to form Șimișna Commune.

References

Communes in Sălaj County
Localities in Transylvania